La Reina del Sur may refer to:
 , by Arturo Pérez-Reverte
 La Reina del Sur (TV series), an adaptation of the novel for television
 La Reina del Sur (album), a 2002 album by Los Tigres del Norte